dCTP pyrophosphatase 1 is an enzyme that in humans is encoded by the DCTPP1 gene.

See also
 Deoxycytidine triphosphate (dCTP)
 Transactivation

References

Further reading